Old Spanish, also known as Old Castilian, or Medieval Spanish, was originally a dialect of Vulgar Latin spoken in the former provinces of the Roman Empire that provided the root for the early form of the Spanish language that was spoken on the Iberian Peninsula from the 10th century until roughly the beginning of the 15th century, before a consonantal readjustment gave rise to the evolution of modern Spanish. The poem  ('The Poem of the Cid'), published around 1200, is the best known and most extensive work of literature in Old Spanish.

Phonology

The phonological system of Old Spanish was quite similar to that of other medieval Romance languages.

Sibilants
Among the consonants, there were seven sibilants, including three sets of voiceless/voiced pairs:
Voiced alveolar affricate : represented by 
Voiceless postalveolar affricate : represented by 

The set of sounds is identical to that found in medieval Portuguese and almost the same as the system present in the modern Mirandese language.

The Modern Spanish system evolved from the Old Spanish one with the following changes:
 The voiced sibilants then all lost their voicing and so merged with the voiceless ones.
In some parts of Andalusia and the Canary Islands, however (and so then in Latin America), the merged  was instead drawn forward, merging into .

Changes 2–4 all occurred in a short period of time, around 1550–1600.

The Old Spanish spelling of the sibilants was identical to modern Portuguese spelling, which, unlike Spanish, still preserves most of the sounds of the medieval language, and so is still a mostly faithful representation of the spoken language. Examples of words before spelling was altered in 1815 to reflect the changed pronunciation:

  'bear' versus  'I dare' (Modern Spanish  in both cases,  Portuguese  [a borrowing from Latin])
  'sickles' versus  'base levels' (Modern Spanish  in both cases,  Portuguese )
  'lame' versus  'I seize' (Modern Spanish  in both cases,  Portuguese)
  'chief' (Modern Spanish ,  Portuguese )
  (Modern Spanish ,  Portuguese )
  'if only' (Modern Spanish ,  Portuguese )
  'leave' (Modern Spanish ,  Portuguese )
  or  'make' (Modern Spanish ,  Portuguese )
  'say' (Modern Spanish ,  Portuguese )
  'lance' (Modern Spanish ,  Portuguese )

Bilabial consonants

Voiced 
( derived from Latin word-initial  or intervocalic , while  derived from Latin  or intervocalic .) Nevertheless, the two sounds could be confused in consonant clusters ( ~ 'dawn') or in word-initial position, perhaps after  or a pause. The two appear to have merged in word-initial position by about 1400 CE and in all other environments by the mid–late 16th century at the latest.

Voiceless 

  before non-back vowels,  or 
  before the back vowels  and 
  or  before 

By the early stages of Old Spanish, the allophone  had spread to all prevocalic environments and possibly before  as well.

This had the effect of introducing into Old Spanish numerous borrowings beginning with a labiodental . Compare also the native  'speech' and borrowed  'fable'. In some cases, doublets appear in apparently native vocabulary, possibly the result of borrowings from other Ibero-Romance varieties; compare modern  'iron' and  'branding iron' or the names Hernando and Fernando.

Old Spanish had , just as Modern Spanish does, which mostly represents a development of earlier * (still preserved in Portuguese and French), from the Latin .
 'milk' from earlier  (Latin ,  Portuguese , French )
 'much', from earlier  (Latin ,  Portuguese , French  (rare, regional))
 'night', from earlier  (Latin ,  Portuguese , French )
 'eight', from earlier  (Latin ,  Portuguese , French )
 'made' or 'fact', from earlier  (Latin ,  Portuguese , French )

Palatal nasal
Later,  was used exclusively, and it came to be considered a letter in its own right by Modern Spanish.

Orthography

Writing systems 
Old Spanish was generally written with some variation of the Latin script. In addition, the Arabic script was used by crypto-Muslims for certain writings in dialectal Spanish or Aragonese in a writing system called Aljamiado.

Spelling

Greek digraphs 
  (Modern Spanish )
  (Modern Spanish )
  (Modern Spanish )
  (Modern Spanish )

Word-initial Y to I 

Morphology

In the perfect tenses, the past participle often agreed with the gender and number of the direct object:  was used instead of Modern Spanish  ('María has sung two songs'). However, that was inconsistent even in the earliest texts.

Personal pronouns and substantives were placed after the verb in any tense or mood unless a stressed word was before the verb.

The future and the conditional tenses were not yet fully grammaticalised as inflections; rather, they were still periphrastic formations of the verb  in the present or imperfect indicative followed by the infinitive of a main verb. Pronouns, therefore, by the general placement rules, could be inserted between the main verb and the auxiliary in these periphrastic tenses, as still occurs with Portuguese (mesoclisis):

  (Fazienda de Ultra Mar, 194)
  (literal translation into Modern Spanish)
  (literal translation into Portuguese)
 And he said: "I will return to Jerusalem." (English translation)

  (Cantar de mio Cid, 92)
  (Modern Spanish equivalent)
  (Portuguese equivalent)
 I will pawn them it for whatever it be reasonable (English translation)

When there was a stressed word before the verb, the pronouns would go before the verb: .

Generally, an unstressed pronoun and a verb in simple sentences combined into one word. In a compound sentence, the pronoun was found in the beginning of the clause:  = .

The future subjunctive was in common use ( in the second example above) but it is generally now found only in legal or solemn discourse and in the spoken language in some dialects, particularly in areas of Venezuela, to replace the imperfect subjunctive. It was used similarly to its Modern Portuguese counterpart, in place of the modern present subjunctive in a subordinate clause after ,  etc., when an event in the future is referenced:

 
  (Cantar de mio Cid, 223–224)

 
  (Modern Spanish equivalent)

 
  (Portuguese equivalent; 'ventura' is an obsolete word for 'luck'.)

 If you do so and fortune is favourable toward me,
 I will send to your altar fine and rich offerings (English translation)

Vocabulary

Sample text

Below is the original Old Spanish text in the first column, along with the same text in Modern Spanish in the second column and an English translation in the third column.

–Ya sennor glorioso, padre que en çielo estas,
Fezist çielo e tierra, el terçero el mar,
Fezist estrelas e luna, e el sol pora escalentar,
Prisist en carnaçion en sancta maria madre,
En belleem apareçist, commo fue tu veluntad,
Pastores te glorificaron, ovieron de a laudare,
Tres Reyes de arabia te vinieron adorar,
Melchior e gaspar e baltasar, oro e tus e mirra
Te offreçieron, commo fue tu veluntad.
Saluest a jonas quando cayo en la mar,
Saluest a daniel con los leones en la mala carçel,
Saluest dentro en Roma al sennor san sabastián,
Saluest a sancta susanna del falso criminal,
Por tierra andidiste xxxii annos, sennor spirital,
Mostrando los miraculos, por en auemos que fablar,
Del agua fezist vino e dela piedra pan,
Resuçitest a Lazaro, ca fue tu voluntad,
Alos judios te dexeste prender, do dizen monte caluarie
Pusieron te en cruz, por nombre en golgota,
Dos ladrones contigo, estos de sennas partes,
El vno es en parayso, ca el otro non entro ala,
Estando en la cruz vertud fezist muy grant,
Longinos era çiego, que nuquas vio alguandre,
Diot con la lança enel costado, dont yxio la sangre,
Corrio la sangre por el astil ayuso, las manos se ouo de vntar,
Alçolas arriba, legolas a la faz,
Abrio sos oios, cato atodas partes,
En ti crouo al ora, por end es saluo de mal.
Enel monumento Resuçitest e fust alos ynfiernos,
Commo fue tu voluntad,
Quebranteste las puertas e saqueste los padres sanctos.
Tueres Rey delos Reyes e de todel mundo padre,
Ati adoro e creo de toda voluntad,
E Ruego a san peydro que me aiude a Rogar
Por mio çid el campeador, que dios le curie de mal,
Quando oy nos partimos, en vida nos faz iuntar.
–Oh Señor glorioso, Padre que en el cielo estás,
Hiciste el cielo y la tierra, al tercer día el mar,
Hiciste las estrellas y la luna, y el sol para calentar,
Te encarnaste en Santa María madre,
En Belén apareciste, como fue tu voluntad,
Pastores te glorificaron, te tuvieron que loar,
Tres reyes de Arabia te vinieron a adorar,
Melchor, Gaspar y Baltasar; oro, incienso y mirra
Te ofrecieron, como fue tu voluntad.
Salvaste a Jonás cuando cayó en el mar,
Salvaste a Daniel con los leones en la mala cárcel,
Salvaste dentro de Roma al señor San Sebastián,
Salvaste a Santa Susana del falso criminal,
Por tierra anduviste treinta y dos años, Señor espiritual,
Mostrando los milagros, por ende tenemos qué hablar,
Del agua hiciste vino y de la piedra pan,
Resucitaste a Lázaro, porque fue tu voluntad,
Por los judíos te dejaste prender, en donde llaman Monte Calvario
Te pusieron en la cruz, en un lugar llamado Golgotá,
Dos ladrones contigo, estos de sendas partes,
Uno está en el paraíso, porque el otro no entró allá,
Estando en la cruz hiciste una virtud muy grande,
Longinos era ciego que jamás se vio,
Te dio con la lanza en el costado, de donde salió la sangre,
Corrió la sangre por el astil abajo, las manos se tuvo que untar,
Las alzó arriba, se las llevó a la cara,
Abrió sus ojos, miró a todas partes,
En ti creyó entonces, por ende se salvó del mal.
En el monumento resucitaste y fuiste a los infiernos,
Como fue tu voluntad,
Quebrantaste las puertas y sacaste a los padres santos.
Tú eres Rey de los reyes y de todo el mundo padre,
A ti te adoro y en ti creo de toda voluntad,
Y ruego a San Pedro que me ayude a rogar
Por mi Cid el Campeador, que Dios le cuide del mal,
Cuando hoy partamos, en vida haznos juntar.
O glorious Lord, Father who art in Heaven,
Thou madest Heaven and Earth, and on the third day the sea,
Thou madest the stars and the Moon, and the Sun for warmth,
Thou incarnatedst Thyself of the Blessed Mother Mary,
In Bethlehem Thou appearedst, for it was Thy will,
Shepherds glorified Thee, they gave Thee praise,
Three kings of Arabia came to worship Thee,
Melchior, Caspar, and Balthazar; offered Thee
Gold, frankincense, and myrrh, for it was Thy will.
Thou savedst Jonah when he fell into the sea,
Thou savedst Daniel from the lions in the terrible jail,
Thou savedst Saint Sebastian in Rome,
Thou savedst Saint Susan from the false charge,
On Earth Thou walkedst thirty-two years, Spiritual Lord,
Performing miracles, thus we have of which to speak,
Of the water Thou madest wine and of the stone bread,
Thou revivedst Lazarus, because it was Thy will,
Thou leftest Thyself to be arrested by the Jews, where they call Mount Calvary,
They placed Thee on the Cross, in the place called Golgotha,
Two thieves with Thee, these of split paths,
One is in Paradise, but the other did not enter there,
Being on the Cross Thou didst a very great virtue,
Longinus was blind ever he saw Thee,
He gave Thee a blow with the lance in the broadside, where he left the blood,
Running down the arm, the hands Thou hadst spread,
Raised it up, as it led to Thy face,
Opened their eyes, saw all parts,
And believed in Thee then, thus saved them from evil.
Thou revivedst in the tomb and went to Hell,
For it was Thy will,
Thou hast broken the doors and brought out the holy fathers.
Thou art King of Kings and of all the world Father,
I worship Thee and I believe in all Thy will,
And I pray to Saint Peter to help with my prayer,
For my Cid the Champion, that God nurse from evil,
When we part today, that we are joined in this life or the next.

See also
History of the Spanish language
Early Modern Spanish (Middle Spanish)

Notes

References

Bibliography 
 
 Lloyd, Paul M. 1987. From Latin to Spanish. Philadelphia: American Philosophical Society. 
 Penny, Ralph. 2002. A history of the Spanish language. Cambridge University Press.

External links
 An explanation of the development of Mediaeval Spanish sibilants in Castile and Andalusia.

History of the Spanish language
Spanish language, Old